Gregory Stephen Smith, OAM (born 19 August 1967) is an Australian Paralympic athlete and wheelchair rugby player who won three gold medals in athletics at the 2000 Summer Paralympics, and a gold medal in wheelchair rugby at the 2012 Summer Paralympics, where he was the flag bearer at the opening ceremony.

Personal
Smith was born on 19 August 1967 in the Victorian city of Ballarat. He broke his neck in a car accident in 1987 while he was a physical training instructor with the Australian Army.  The accident left him with little movement from the chest down. He went through one and a half years of gruelling rehabilitation but his life became active again in 1988 after another patient lent him a racing wheelchair.

Athletics career

Smith won a gold medal in the men's 4x100 m T1 at the World Championships and Games for the Disabled in Assen, Netherlands. He then began his long Paralympic career with a silver medal in the men's 4x100 m relay TW1–2, and bronze medals in the men's marathon TW2 and the men's 4x400 m relay TW1–2 at the 1992 Barcelona Games. He also competed in the men's 800 m, 1500 m and 5000 m TW2 events. In 1992, he held a scholarship with the Victorian Institute of Sport in athletics. That year, he finished fourth in the 10 km road race at the 1992 Oz Day race. In 1995, he was awarded an Australian Institute of Sport Athletes with a Disability non-residential scholarship which he held until 2000.

At the 1996 Atlanta Games, Smith won a silver medal in the men's 5000 m T51. He also competed in the men's 400 m, 1500 m and marathon in T51 events. Smith won three gold medals at the 2000 Sydney Games in the men's 800 m T52, men's 1500 m T52 and men's 5000 m T52 events, for which he received a Medal of the Order of Australia. He also competed in the men's marathon T52. At the 1998 IPC Athletics World Championships in Berlin, he won four gold medals in the men's 800 m, men's 1500 m, men's 5000 m and the men's marathon.

Wheelchair Rugby career

Smith retired from wheelchair athletics in 2002. After a two-year break, he took up wheelchair rugby socially and at the end of his first season he won the New South Wales State League Most Valuable Player Award and the National League Best New Talent. In 2006, he represented Australia for the first time in wheelchair rugby at the Canada Cup International Tournament. He was a member of the Australian mixed team that won the silver medal in wheelchair rugby at the 2008 Beijing Games  . After Beijing, he retired as a player but continued as an assistant coach. He came out of retirement in 2010 and was re-selected to the Australian squad in 2011. He was the Australian flag bearer at the 2012 London Games, and was part of the team that won the gold medal. He retired after the Games but still has an active interest in the sport.

At the 2018 World Championships in Sydney, he was the Assistant Coach of the Australian team that won the silver medal after being defeated by Japan 61–62 in the gold medal game.

Recognition
OAM, 2001 
Australian Team Flag Bearer at 2012 Summer Paralympics 
Honorary Doctorate, University of Ballarat, 2013

References

External links
Greg Smith at Australian Athletics Historical Results

Paralympic athletes of Australia
Paralympic wheelchair rugby players of Australia
Athletes (track and field) at the 1992 Summer Paralympics
Athletes (track and field) at the 1996 Summer Paralympics
Athletes (track and field) at the 2000 Summer Paralympics
Wheelchair rugby players at the 2008 Summer Paralympics
Wheelchair rugby players at the 2012 Summer Paralympics
Medalists at the 1992 Summer Paralympics
Medalists at the 1996 Summer Paralympics
Medalists at the 2000 Summer Paralympics
Medalists at the 2008 Summer Paralympics
Medalists at the 2012 Summer Paralympics
Paralympic gold medalists for Australia
Paralympic silver medalists for Australia
Paralympic bronze medalists for Australia
Recipients of the Medal of the Order of Australia
Australian Institute of Sport Paralympic track and field athletes
Victorian Institute of Sport alumni
Sportspeople from Ballarat
1967 births
Living people
Paralympic medalists in athletics (track and field)
Paralympic medalists in wheelchair rugby
Australian male wheelchair racers